Davor is an old Slavic given name possibly derived from the prehistoric Slavic god of war (equivalent of Mars) or from an old exclamation expressing joy or sorrow. Feminine variant: Davorka. The name may refer to:

Davor Antunović (born 1979), popular German author and psychotherapist
Davor Badrov (born 1992), Bosnian singer
Davor Bernardić (born 1980), Croatian politician
Davor Božinović (born 1961), Croatian diplomat and politician
Davor Čop (born 1958), Croatian and Yugoslav footballer
Davor Dominiković (born 1978), Croatian handball player
Davor Dujmović (1969–1999), Bosnian Serb actor
Davor Džalto (born 1980), artist and art historian
Davor Gobac (born 1964), Croatian rock singer
Davor Jozić (born 1960), Croatian and Yugoslav footballer
Davor Kus (born 1978), Croatian basketball player
Davor Marcelić (born 1969), Croatian basketball player
Davor Pejčinović (born 1971), Croatian basketball player
Davor Ivo Stier (born 1972), Croatian politician
Davor Šuker (born 1968), Croatian footballer, 1998 FIFA World Cup Golden Boot winner
Davor Vugrinec (born 1975), Croatian footballer
Davor Lopar (born 1998), Serbian basketball player
Davor Štefanek (born 1985), Serbian Olympic Wrestling Champion

External links
http://www.behindthename.com/name/davor
http://www.babynamewizard.com/namipedia/boy/davor
https://actacroatica.com/en/name/Davor/

Slavic masculine given names
Croatian masculine given names
Macedonian masculine given names
Montenegrin masculine given names
Slovene masculine given names
Serbian masculine given names

Ukrainian masculine given names
Bulgarian masculine given names